Blitchton may refer to:

 Blitchton, Florida
 Blitchton, Georgia